Marianne Walla was an Austrian film and theater actress. After Hitler's Anschluss of Austria she was forced to emigrate to Great Britain.

Career
Little is known about the life and work of Marianne Walla. She performed the role Good Works in Jedermann by Hugo von Hofmannsthal at the Salzburg Festival from 1930 to 1937. Only two further productions in Austria are documented, both at ABC im Regenbogen in Vienna, both in plays by Jura Soyfer. In 1937, she was seen in Die Botschaft von Astoria, in 1938 she embodied the Queen in Broadway-Melodie 1492, directed by Rudolf Steinböck.

After her emigration to London, she participated in the opening of the Austrian exile stage Das Laterndl on 27 June 1939. The performances took place at the Austrian Center and were directed by Martin Miller, another emigrant from Austria. Again she performed in a play by Soyfer, she played Fritzi in The Lechner Edi looks into paradise. In 1943, she married British citizen John M. Brice.

In the post-war years, she performed in several film and television productions.

Filmography

External links 
 
 Theatre photography: Der Lechner Edi, 1940

References

Austrian actresses
British actresses
Living people
Year of birth missing (living people)